A by-election was held in the state electoral district of The Hills on 1 September 1990. The by-election was triggered by the resignation of Fred Caterson.

Dates

Result	

Fred Caterson resigned.

See also
Electoral results for the district of The Hills
List of New South Wales state by-elections

References

1990 elections in Australia
New South Wales state by-elections
1990s in New South Wales